Dance Ireland is an association that promotes professional dance in Ireland. It operates DanceHouse, a dance centre in Dublin.

It was established in 1989 and incorporated as a not-for-profit company limited by guarantee in 1992 under the name Association of Professional Dancers in Ireland Ltd (APDI). It adopted the trading name Dance Ireland in 2006.

References

External links 

Irish dance
Dance organizations
Cultural organisations based in the Republic of Ireland
1989 establishments in Ireland